The 2009 NCAA Division III men's lacrosse tournament was held from May 9 through May 24, 2009. This was the 30th annual Division III NCAA Men's Lacrosse Championship tournament. Sixteen NCAA Division III college men's lacrosse teams met after having played their way through a regular season, and for some, a play-in game to advance to the tournament.

The tournament culminated with the finals, held on Memorial Day weekend at Gillette Stadium in Foxborough, Massachusetts. The championship weekend included the Division I and Division II championships.

Play-in games
The final four rounds of the tournament were preceded by six play-in games on May 6:
Springfield 21 – Mount Ida 4
St. Lawrence 14 – Nazareth 7
E. Connecticut 10 – USMMA 9
Cabrini 17 – Montclair State 3
Denison 12 – Ohio Wesleyan 2
W&L 6 – FDU-Florham 5 *

Tournament results 

 * = Overtime

References

NCAA Division III Men's Lacrosse Championship
NCAA Division III Men's Lacrosse Championship
NCAA Division III Men's Lacrosse Championship
NCAA Division III Men's Lacrosse Championship
NCAA Division III Men's Lacrosse Championship
College sports in Massachusetts
Lacrosse in Massachusetts
Sports competitions in Foxborough, Massachusetts